"Groupie Luv" is a song by performed by American Hip Hop supergroup 213, which consisted of Snoop Dogg, Warren G and Nate Dogg. It was released on 2004 as the second single off their studio album The Hard Way, with the record label TVT Records. The song was produced by DJ Pooh.

Music video 
The video of the song was produced by Chris Robinson and shot at the house of Snoop Dogg.

Track listing 
CD Single
Groupie Luv (Clean) — 3:53
Groupie Luv (Street) — 3:53
Groupie Luv (Instrumental) — 3:53

Charts

References

2004 singles
Snoop Dogg songs
Warren G songs
Nate Dogg songs
Song recordings produced by DJ Pooh
TVT Records singles
2004 songs
Songs written by Warren G
Songs written by Snoop Dogg
Songs written by Nate Dogg